Pires do Rio is a municipality in Goiás state, Brazil.  It is a prosperous town and a major producer of poultry.

Location
It is located in the Pires do Rio Microregion. Citybrazil.  It is located 144 kilometers from the state capital and is served by highways GO-020, 330 and 414, as well as by several municipal roads.  Connections from Goiânia are made by BR-352 / Bela Vista de Goiás / Cristianópolis / BR-352 / G-020 / Santa Cruz de Goiás / Palmelo. Distancias Rodoviarias Sepin

Neighboring municipalities are: Caldas Novas, Cristianópolis, Ipameri, Orizona, Palmelo, Santa Cruz de Goiás, Urutaí and Vianópolis.

Districts, Villages, and Hamlets
Hamlets: Engenheiro Balduino and Soldado Esteves

History
The city owes its beginnings to the coming of the railroad to Goiás.  The railroad company proposed the construction of a railroad station in the region if the lands were made available to start a community.  Coronel Lino Teixeira Sampaio, one of the founders of the town, the other one being Balduino Ernesto de Almeida, donated lands from his ranch to build the first houses.  An area was reserved for the town and a plan was drawn up.  This was never carried out since the residents built their houses outside the area.  In 1922 a metal bridge was built over the Rio Corumbá and the settlement began to grow attracting residents from nearby areas.  The name, Pires do Rio, was given to the train station and then to the town, in honor of the Minister of Transportation and Public Works of Brazil José Pires do Rio.  Source:  Sepin.

Political information
Mayor: Luís Eduardo Pitaluga (January 2009)
Eligible voters:
Votes for Mayor in last election: 
Political party:
City council: 9 members

Demographics
Population density: 25.02 inhabitants/km2 (2007)
Population in 1980: 19,258
Population in 2009: 27,928
Urban population: 25,031(2007)
Rural population: 1,826 (2007)
Population growth or loss: a gain of about 9,500 people since 1980

The economy
The economy is based on agriculture, cattle raising, services, public administration, and small transformation industries.  The soil also has deposits of clay for the manufacture of roof tiles and bricks.
Industrial units: 66 (2007)
Commercial units: 435 (2007)
Bank agencies: Banco do Brasil S.A. - BRADESCO S.A. - Banco Itaú S.A., (August 2007) - CEF
Dairy: Indústria e Comércio de Laticínios Pires do Rio Ltda (22/05/2006)
Meat packing plant: Nutriza Agroindustrial de Alimentos S/A

Motor vehicles
Automobiles: 4,481
Pickup trucks: 907
Number of inhabitants per motor vehicle: 5
Cattle herd: 85,500 head (2006)
Poultry: 1,710,500 head (2004)
Main crops (2005): pineapple, rice, coffee, beans, manioc, soybeans (5,200 hectares), and corn.

Agricultural data 2006
Number of farms:  618
Total area:  78,530 ha.
Area of permanent crops: 33 ha.
Area of perennial crops: 4,178 ha.
Area of natural pasture:  50,542 ha. 
Area of woodland and forests:  22,525 ha. 
Persons dependent on farming:  1,700
Farms with tractors: 117
Number of tractors:  182
Cattle herd:  85,500 head IBGE

Education (2006)
Schools: 28
Classrooms: 184
Teachers: 364
Students: 7,562
Higher education: Campus of the State University of Goiás - Faculdade do Sudoeste Goiano- FASUG 
Adult literacy rate: 91.0% (2000) (national average was 86.4%)

Health (2009)
Hospitals: 1
Hospital beds: 126
Ambulatory clinics: 5
Infant mortality rate: 24.45 (2000) (national average was 33.0).

Tourism
The main attraction of the town is the natural environment of the Cachoeira (Waterfall) do Maratá.  It has 70 meters of free fall and is visited for skydiving, camping, and swimming activities.  Another tourist point is the old Usina do Salto, an abandoned hydroelectric plant built in 1930.  It attracts tourists for camping, kayaking, and innertube floating.

In the town there is a railroad museum, which has several objects from  the days when Pires do Rio was on the railroad line.

Municipal Human Development Index
MHDI:  0.785
State ranking:  21 (out of 242 municipalities)
National ranking:  943 (out of 5,507 municipalities)  
For the complete list see Frigoletto.com

See also 
List of municipalities in Goiás
Microregions of Goiás

References 

Frigoletto
 Sepin

External links 
Municipal government
Pires do Rio Online

Municipalities in Goiás